Eucalyptus gigantangion, commonly known as Kakadu woollybutt, is a species of tree that is endemic to the Northern Territory. It has soft, fibrous bark most of the trunk, smooth white bark above, narrow lance-shaped adult leaves, flower buds in groups of seven, orange-coloured flowers and ribbed, urn-shaped fruit.

Description
It has rough but soft, fibrous, orange-brown to red-brown, dark grey or black bark over most of the trunk with the upper trunk and branches covered with smooth white bark.

Flowering occurs from July to August and the flowers are orange.

Taxonomy and naming
Eucalyptus gigantangion was first formally described in 1991 by the botanists Lawrie Johnson and Ken Hill in the journal Telopea. The specific epithet (gigantangion) "is derived from the Ancient Greek words gigas, gigantos, a giant and aggeion (usually transliterated as angion), a vessel or receptacle, from the extremely large fruits".

Distribution and habitat
Kakadu woollybutt grows in savanna forests with Triodia and shrubs in the understorey. It is found near the upper edge of sandstone cliffs on the Arnhem Land escarpment, mostly only in Kakadu National Park.

See also
List of Eucalyptus species

References

Trees of Australia
gigantangion
Myrtales of Australia
Flora of the Northern Territory
Plants described in 1991